Stillman Creek, also known during different eras as Mud Creek, Old Man's Creek, Sycamore Creek, and Stillman's Run, is part of the Rock River watershed, and located in Ogle County, Illinois, United States. The stream was named for Isaiah Stillman, who also lent his name to the village of Stillman Valley, Illinois, which lies along the creek.

Course
Stillman Creek originates near Kings, Illinois and continues its course through Ogle County until it reaches the Rock River at its mouth.

Natural history
The land surrounding the Rock River and its tributaries is home to a wide variety of plant and animal species. Found throughout the Rock River country 122 species of native birds, 33 species of reptiles, 78 species of mammals, 33 species of native mussel and 10 species of native crustaceans. Of the 950 plant taxa found in the river country, 27 are ferns species. In total, 56 species of Illinois endangered or threatened species make their habitat within Rock River country.

History
The creek was the site of the 1832 Battle of Stillman's Run during the Black Hawk War. The battle and the creek became humorously known as "Stillman's Run" after Stillman and his men fled the battlefield in defeat, believing they were being chased by thousands of Chief Black Hawk's warriors. The use of the word "run" was a double entendre describing both the creek and Stillman's "tactics" during the battle. It has been known by other names as well, those include, Mud Creek, Old Man's Creek, and Sycamore Creek. The stream's current name, Stillman Creek, descended from Isaiah Stillman, who also lent his name to the village of Stillman Valley (via the creek), along the creek, in Ogle County. A 1999 water quality assessment by the Illinois Environmental Protection Agency rated Stillman's Creek as "good," along with about 78% of the rest of the water ways found in the Rock River watershed. In modern times, the village of Stillman Valley has been authorized to discharge treated wastewater into the creek. During the 2007 Midwest flooding the creek poured over its banks.

Geography

Notes

References
"The Rock River Country: An Inventory of the Region's Resources," Regional Watershed Assessments, 2000, Illinois Department of Natural Resources. Retrieved 14 August 2007.

Rivers of Ogle County, Illinois
Black Hawk War
Rivers of Illinois